"Words Just Get in the Way" is a song by English singer-songwriter Richard Ashcroft and is featured on his 2006 album, Keys to the World. It was released on 10 July 2006 as the third single from that album, charting at  40 on the UK Singles Chart. The music video features footage of Richard's Homecoming Show at Old Trafford Cricket Ground, England (LCCC) on 17 June 2006. Guy Berryman, the bass player for the band Coldplay, can also be seen with Richard at Silverstone, home of the British Grand Prix.

Track listings
 7-inch clear vinyl (R6700)
 "Words Just Get in the Way"
 "Circles"

 CD (CDR6700)
 "Words Just Get in the Way"
 "New York" (live at London's Kings College)

 DVD (DVDR6700)
 "Words Just Get in the Way"
 "Circles"
 "New York" (live at London's Kings College)
 "Words Just Get in the Way" (video)

References

2006 singles
2006 songs
Parlophone singles
Richard Ashcroft songs
Song recordings produced by Chris Potter (record producer)
Songs written by Richard Ashcroft